Tessenberg is also a locality in Heinfels, Austria.
Tessenberg (French: Montagne de Diesse or Plateau de Diesse) is an elevated plateau above Lake Biel, on the southern slopes of Chasseral, at an elevation of about 800 m. It is divided between the Swiss cantons of Berne and Neuchâtel, and three municipalities, Nods, Lignières  and Plateau de Diesse.

History 
The area was part of the dominion of the Counts of Neuchâtel from the 12th century. It was later administered jointly by the counts of Neuchâtel and the Prince-bishopric of Basel and Berne. 
Tessenberg was occupied by French troops in December 1797 and partly adjoined to the French département Mont-Terrible.
The territory was returned to Switzerland, as part of the canton of Berne (Erlach District, after 1846 La Neuveville District), following the Congress of Vienna of 1815.

References 
 .

Landforms of the canton of Bern
Landforms of the canton of Neuchâtel
Aare basin
Jura Mountains